Johannes Jeroen Maria (Jeroen) Henneman (17 October 1942) is a Dutch painter, draftsman, graphic artist, illustrator, and sculptor from Haarlem in the Netherlands. He often works with illuminated art as an art medium.

Education
He studied art at the Institute for Applied Arts in Amsterdam. After finishing his education he travelled to other areas of Europe like: Belgium, France, Switzerland. He also spent time in the United States in the early 1960s.

Career
Henneman worked with illuminated art work in the 1960s. He has several of his outdoor artworks displayed in Amsterdam.

Gallery

Public art
The Kiss (1982) for Koninklijke Bijenkorf Management in Amsterdam
The Wheel (1996)
Birds , Amsterdam South District Office
The Lamp (2000), Hanzelaan, Zwolle [2]
Portrait of King Willem I (2003), Kraanstraat in Breda
The Scream (2006), Oosterpark, Amsterdam
Pencil and paper (2006), Provincial House , Zwolle
Portrait Jan Dellaert (2006), Schiphol Plaza Schiphol Airport
The Kiss (2007), Station Square in Apeldoorn
Portrait of Leo Vroman (2015), Library of Gouda
The box (2017), De Boelelaan, Amsterdam

See also
List of Dutch sculptors

References

External links
IMDb Jeroen Henneman
Video Jeroen Henneman
Jeroen Henneman's website

20th-century Dutch sculptors
21st-century sculptors
1942 births
Living people
Dutch painters
Dutch sculptors
Dutch graphic designers